"Reunion" is the 81st episode of the syndicated American science fiction television series Star Trek: The Next Generation, It is the seventh episode of the fourth season.

Set in the 24th century, the series follows the adventures of the Starfleet crew of the Federation starship Enterprise-D. In this episode, ambassador K'Ehleyr returns to the Enterprise to advise Captain Picard, who has been chosen as a neutral party to arbitrate the selection of the new Klingon leader from two candidates, Gowron and Duras, one of whom is suspected to be a traitor.

Plot 
The starship Enterprise is met by a Klingon Vor'cha class battlecruiser, and Ambassador K'Ehleyr (Suzie Plakson) requests to speak to Captain Picard (Patrick Stewart) on an "urgent matter". When she beams aboard, she brings a young Klingon boy (Jon Paul Steuer); based on his previous romantic experience with the half-Klingon, half-human K'Ehleyr, Lt. Worf (Michael Dorn) suspects the child is his son. K'Ehleyr warns the senior staff of a power struggle occurring within the Klingon Empire and implores Picard to meet Chancellor K'mpec (Charles Cooper) aboard the battlecruiser. On the Klingon ship, K'mpec acknowledges that he has been poisoned and is slowly dying, and insists that Picard become the Arbiter of Succession and identify his assassin; he suspects that it was either Gowron or Duras, the two contenders for the succession. K'mpec ruefully  admits he had covered up Duras’ treason in the Khitomer massacre, and ironically remarks that his epitaph should be "..all for the glory of the Klingon Empire." He dies shortly afterward. In a private moment, K'Ehleyr confirms to Worf that the Klingon boy is his son,  Alexander, and she did not tell Worf for fear he would try to have a deeper relationship with her; Worf, already burdened by his discommendation, fears for Alexander's future, given the stigma of his family name.

The two challengers for leadership of the council, Gowron (Robert O'Reilly) and Duras (Patrick Massett), arrive for the Rites of Succession. Worf still harbors hatred for Duras, who had covered his own family's treason by stating that Worf's father, Mogh, was the traitor in the Khitomer massacre, staining Worf's family name. Both Gowron and Duras attempt to quickly end the proceeding, but a small explosion erupts in the assembly hall. Picard and K'Ehleyr are safe but decide to draw out the Rites using an archaic ceremony while the Enterprise crew perform a forensic analysis on the explosion. Though both resent the longer form, Gowron and Duras have little choice but to agree to continue the Rites.

The Enterprise crew discover that the explosion came from a Romulan bomb worn by one of Duras' guards. K'Ehleyr, aboard the Enterprise, has become intrigued and tries to find out why Worf was discommended. She accesses the Klingon records, and comes across evidence of Duras's father being the true traitor in the Khitomer massacre. Duras, notified of K'Ehleyr's access to the records, confronts her and mortally wounds her. Worf soon discovers K'Ehleyr, dying, just in time for her to reveal that Duras is her killer; then she has Worf promise to look after Alexander. Returning to his quarters, Worf grabs a bat'leth, leaves his combadge behind, and transports to Duras's ship. There he challenges Duras to the Right of Vengeance. Initially, Duras rebuffs Worf (claiming "You have no rights here, traitor!"), but Worf points out that K'Ehleyr was his mate; since even discommendated Klingons may claim vengeance for a loved one's death, Duras accepts Worf's challenge. Worf easily gains the upper hand, but Duras taunts him - if Worf kills Duras, Worf can never regain his honor. Worf nonetheless strikes the killing blow. With Duras dead and no other challengers present, Gowron is named Chancellor of the Empire.

After the Klingons leave, Picard takes Worf to task for killing Duras. Though Worf defends his actions as valid under Klingon law (as does the Klingon government), Picard reminds him he is first of all a Starfleet officer and places a formal reprimand on Worf's record; Picard asks with Duras dead, why withhold the truth? Worf explains the High Council will not admit their actions-but vows he and his brother will call them to account. (In Redemption the High Council refuses to accept Gowron and instead supports the House of Duras, triggering a Klingon Civil War). Worf and Alexander mourn their loss, and Worf places the boy in the care of his own adoptive parents, Sergey and Helena Rozhenko.

Production 
This episode introduced a fictional spacecraft to the Star Trek franchise, the "Vor'cha", a Klingon starship which was designed by Rick Sternbach and the model built by Greg Jein.  This was also the first episode with the Klingon recurring character Gowron, who would appear in subsequent episodes of both TNG and Star Trek: Deep Space Nine; the character was played by Robert O'Reilly.

The Bat'leth prop, a Klingon weapon, was designed by  Dan Curry for this episode. Dan Curry was the visual effects producer.  The Bat'leth later appeared many times and became known in pop culture.

Reception 
In 2016, the story of K'Ehleyr in "Reunion" was noted as one of the saddest conclusions in Star Trek franchise. In 2017, Den of Geek ranked Suzie Plakson's role as K'Ehleyr as one of the top ten guest stars on Star Trek: The Next Generation, noting her performance in this episode and earlier episode which introduced the character, "The Emissary".

In 2017, Den of Geek ranked this episode as one of top 25 "must watch" episodes of Star Trek: The Next Generation.

In 2017, Comic Book Resources ranked Worf and K'Ehleyr as the 9th best romantic relationship of the Star Trek franchise up to that time, noting their introduction in the previous episode "The Emissary". They note that in this episode she returns with Worf's son, but is killed by Duras.

Keith R. A. DeCandido of Tor.com rated the episode 10 out of 10.
Zach Handlen of The A.V. Club gave the episode a grade of B+.

Legacy 
K'Ehleyr was suggested as the inspiration for later Star Trek main cast character B'Elanna Torres. In terms of the continuity in the show, it provides an origin story for Worf's son Alexander.

The episode introduced the bat'leth to the series, which became the iconic weapon of the Klingon.

Releases 
"Reunion" was released in the United States on September 3, 2002, as part of the Star Trek: The Next Generation season four season four DVD box set.

See also

 "The Emissary", the second season episode where Worf and K'Ehleyr meet again after six years.
 "Sins of the Father", the third season episode where Worf and Duras first meet.
 "Redemption", Parts I & II, the sequel to "Reunion".

References

External links
 

Star Trek: The Next Generation (season 4) episodes
1990 American television episodes
Television episodes written by Brannon Braga
Television episodes directed by Jonathan Frakes